April Salome Forest Management Area also known as April Salumei Rainforest  is a forest management area in April — Salumei tropical forest covering about 521,500 hectares in Ambunti-Dreikikir District of East Sepik Province, of Papua New Guinea. The forest is located in the basins of two rivers: April and Salumei.  The town of Ambunti serves as a gateway to the April Salome Forest Management Area.

Population 
It is estimated that about 20,000 people are living in this area in 164 forest-dependent communities. Populated places include Nakek and Uwu.

Geography 
April Salome Forest Management Area is located in the Sepik river basin. Sepik tributary, the April river is the major river in the area.

United Nations REDD Programme controversy 
Presently April Salome Forest area is a pilot project for REDD initiative  by United Nations Framework Convention on Climate Change under United Nations REDD Programme. 

It is also mishandling and corruption showcase.

See also 
Papua New Guinea Forestry Authority
Deforestation in Papua New Guinea

References 

Forestry in Papua New Guinea
Populated places in East Sepik Province
Rainforests
Tropical rainforests
Sustainable forest management
Habitat management equipment and methods
Forest certification
Forest governance
Forest conservation
Community-based forestry